Wilder is a city in Canyon County, Idaho, United States. The population was 1,533 at the 2010 census.

Wilder is part of the Boise City–Nampa, Idaho Metropolitan Statistical Area.

History

Wilder was established in 1919, and was named for Marshall P. Wilder, a magazine editor.

Geography
Wilder is located at  (43.676451, -116.910122).

Demographics

2010 census
At the 2010 census there were 1,533 people, 453 households, and 353 families living in the city. The racial makup of the city was 44.6% White, 0.2% African American, 1.8% Native American, 0.4% Asian, 51.1% from other races, and 1.9% from two or more races. Hispanic or Latino of any race were 75.9%.

Of the 453 households 52.5% had children under the age of 18 living with them, 54.1% were married couples living together, 16.8% had a female householder with no husband present, 7.1% had a male householder with no wife present, and 22.1% were non-families. 18.8% of households were one person and 7.2% were one person aged 65 or older. The average household size was 3.38 and the average family size was 3.89.

The median age was 27 years. 37.6% of residents were under the age of 18; 9.4% were between the ages of 18 and 24; 25.6% were from 25 to 44; 18.2% were from 45 to 64; and 9.1% were 65 or older. The gender makeup of the city was 48.7% male and 51.3% female.

2000 census
At the 2000 census there were 1,462 people, 389 households, and 315 families living in the city. The racial makup of the city was 33.99% White, 0.21% African American, 0.14% Native American, 0.27% Asian, 0.07% Pacific Islander, 62.93% from other races, and 2.39% from two or more races. Hispanic or Latino of any race were 76.40%.

Of the 389 households 52.2% had children under the age of 18 living with them, 65.6% were married couples living together, 9.8% had a female householder with no husband present, and 19.0% were non-families. 17.2% of households were one person and 10.5% were one person aged 65 or older.  The average household size was 3.76 and the average family size was 4.30.

The age distribution was 39.2% under the age of 18, 13.3% from 18 to 24, 25.2% from 25 to 44, 15.1% from 45 to 64, and 7.2% 65 or older.  The median age was 24 years. For every 100 females, there were 99.7 males.  For every 100 females age 18 and over, there were 100.7 males.

The median household income was $21,731 and the median family income  was $25,625. Males had a median income of $22,188 versus $16,250 for females. The per capita income for the city was $7,601.  About 27.7% of families and 31.6% of the population were below the poverty line, including 37.4% of those under age 18 and 26.3% of those age 65 or over.

Economy
Wilder has a meat processing plant, SSI, manufacturing frozen individual serving hamburgers and french fries. Wilder is primarily an agricultural community, with onions, hops, seed corn, beans and alfalfa seed among the major crops.

Notable people

 Phil Batt, 29th Governor of Idaho

References

External links
 City of Wilder, Idaho Website Portal style website, Government, Business, Library, Recreation and more
 City-Data.com Comprehensive Statistical Data and more about Wilder

Cities in Canyon County, Idaho
Cities in Idaho
Boise metropolitan area
1919 establishments in Idaho